D'arcy [Darcy] (or variant forms Darci, Darcie, or Darcey), lit. "From Arcy" is a surname from the village of Arcy in La Manche. Becoming very popular in the English language after the Norman conquest of England, while more popular as a surname, it does have some popularity as a given name. Derived given names include girls names like Darcene. The surname is also applied as an anglicization for the Gaelic surname Ó Dorchaidhe.  Notable people with the name include:

Surname
 Antoine d'Arcy, (d. 1517), French soldier, sieur de la Bastie.
 Charles d'Arcy, Church of Ireland Archbishop of Armagh
 Emma D'Arcy, British actor
 Gordon D'Arcy, Irish rugby union player
 Hugues d'Arcy (d. 1352) and the d'Arcy family of French Roman Catholic bishops, related to lords of Arcy-sur-Cure, Burgundy, France
 James D'Arcy, British actor
 John Michael D'Arcy, American Roman Catholic bishop
 John D'Arcy (1785–1839), Founder of the town of Clifden, Connemara, Ireland
 John P. D'Arcy electrical engineer and inventor, formerly married to Meredithe Stuart-Smith, founder of  lifestyle company Meri Meri.
 Martin D'Arcy, Roman Catholic priest and public intellectual
 Nick D'Arcy, Australian Swimmer
 Patrick D'Arcy, Irish nationalist and politician during Irish Confederate Wars
 Ray D'Arcy, Irish television and radio presenter
 Sarah D'Arcy, Australian rules footballer
 Tony D'Arcy, Irish Republican Army volunteer who died on hunger strike in 1940
 William Knox D'Arcy, British oilman

Given name
 D'Arcy Baker (1877–1932), British businessman and racing driver
 D'Arcy Broderick, Canadian musician
 D'Arcy Carden, American actress and comedian
 D'Arcy Corrigan, actor and lawyer
 D'Arcy Osborne, 12th Duke of Leeds 
 D'Arcy McGee, 19th-century Canadian politician
 D'Arcy Short (born 1990), Australian cricketer
 D'Arcy Wentworth Thompson, mathematical biologist
 D'arcy Wretzky, bass player for the Smashing Pumpkins, often credited as simply D'arcy
 Walter D'Arcy Ryan (1870–1934), lighting engineer
 Brian d'Arcy James, (born 1968), American actor and musician

See Also
 Darcy (surname)